Nilmungkorn Sudsakorngym (Thai: นิลมังกร สุดสาครมวยไทยยิมส์ ) is a Thai Muay Thai kickboxer. As an amateur, he won the 2015 IMTF World Championship. In 2016 & 2017 as a professional, Nilmungkorn became the SUPER Muay Thai World Champion, winning the tournament two years in a row. In 2017, he also competed in Lethwei for the International Lethwei Federation Japan at Lethwei in Japan 4 in Tokyo.

Biography
Nilmungkorn is born in the Sisaket Province in the north east of Thailand. He represents the Sudsakorn Muay Thai Gym in Pattaya and takes his name from his trainer Sudsakorn Sor Klinmee.

Career

Muay Thai 
In 2015, Nilmungkorn competed in the International Muay Thai Federation as an amateur and won the IMTF World Championship.

In 2015, Nilmungkorn faced French Muaythai star Jimmy Vienot at MAX Muay Thai in Bangkok. In the first round, Nilmungkorn landed a powerful elbow strike, flooring and opening the lip of Vienot, but the Frenchman came back strong in the second round knocking him out.

In 2016, Nilmungkorn was signed to SUPER Muaythai based in Bangkok. He competed and won the 75 kg tournament two years in a row (2016 & 2017).

Lethwei 
In May 2017, Nilmungkorn was offered to face Dave Leduc for the ILFJ Openweight World Championship at Lethwei in Japan 4 in Tokyo, Japan. He replaced the previous challenger Cyrus Washington after he announced he was pulling out of the fight citing a hand injury. Nilmungkorn accepted to fight KO to win traditional Lethwei rules with no scoring system. Both fighters exchanged words at the pre-fight press conference, where Nilmungkorn stated that he will win the first Japanese Lethwei Belt, while Leduc was quoted saying he will finish Nilmungkorn quickly. Both fighters weighed-in at 79 kg. In a sold out Tokyo Dome City Hall, in the first round, Leduc landed a punch hitting Nilmungkorn on the jaw, forcing him to use his allowed time-out. Leduc won by knockout at 2:23sec of the second round.

Championships and accomplishments

Championships 
  SUPER Muay Thai
 2016 SUPER Muaythai Tournament Champion
 2017 SUPER Muaythai Tournament Champion
Amateur
 2015 IMTF Muay Thai World championship

Muay Thai record

|-  style="background:#cfc;"
| 2017-04-15 || Win ||align=left| Sammy Banchamek || Super Muay Thai || Bangkok, Thailand || KO (Left hook) || 2 || 
|-  style="background:#cfc;"
| 2017-02-11 || Win ||align=left| Charlie Guest || Super Muay Thai || Bangkok, Thailand || Decision || 3 || 3:00
|-  style="background:#cfc;"
| 2016-04-1 || Win ||align=left| Juan Agustin || Super Muay Thai || Bangkok, Thailand || Decision || 3 || 
|-  style="background:#cfc;"
| 2016-00-00 || Win ||align=left| Matthew Richardson || Super Muay Thai || Bangkok, Thailand || Decision || 3 || 3:00
|-  style="background:#cfc;"
| 2016-01-24 || Win ||align=left| Evrim Karagoz || Max Muay Thai Ultimate || Metz, France || KO || 1 || 
|-  style="background:#fbb;"
| 2015-10-17 || Loss ||align=left| Jimmy Vienot || Max Muay Thai || Pattaya, Thailand || KO || 2||
|-  style="background:#fbb;"
| 2015-09-27 || Loss ||align=left| Nicholas Jittigym || Max Muay Thai || Pattaya, Thailand || Decision || 3 || 3:00
|-  style="background:#cfc;"
| 2015-03-06 || Win ||align=left| Thai opponent || Pattaya World Boxing Stadium || Pattaya, Thailand || KO || 2 || 
|-  style="background:#cfc;"
| 2017-03-09 || Win ||align=left| Elias Emammuhamad || Super Muay Thai Tournament Final || Bangkok, Thailand || Decision || 3 || 
|-
! style=background:white colspan=9 |
|-
| colspan=9 | Legend:

Lethwei record 

|-  bgcolor="#fbb"
| 2017-06-16 || Loss ||align=left| Dave Leduc || Lethwei in Japan 4: Frontier || Tokyo, Japan || KO || 2 || 2:23
|-
! style=background:white colspan=9 |
|-
| colspan=9 | Legend:

See also
List of male kickboxers

References

Living people
Nilmungkorn Sudsakorngym
Cruiserweight kickboxers
Nilmungkorn Sudsakorngym
Nilmungkorn Sudsakorngym
Nilmungkorn Sudsakorngym
Year of birth missing (living people)